Malik Tidderious Newman (born February 21, 1997) is an American professional basketball player for Avtodor Saratov of the VTB United League. He played college basketball for the Kansas Jayhawks and the Mississippi State Bulldogs. He attended Callaway High School in Jackson, Mississippi. He helped lead Callaway to four straight victories in the MHSAA Class 5A boys basketball championship. As a senior his jersey number 14 was retired by the school.

High school career

Newman attended Callaway High School in Jackson, Mississippi all four years of his high school basketball career. As a junior, Newman scored 25 points, 6 rebounds, and 2 blocks to defeat Vicksburg High School to win the 2014 Mississippi Class 5A Championship. 
In August 2014, Newman was named the MVP of the 2014 FIBA Under-17 World Championship. As a senior, Newman averaged 29.7 points, 5.7 rebounds, and 4.2 assist per game while leading the Chargers to a (31-3) overall record. Newman was selected to play in the 2015 McDonald's All-American Boys Game, Jordan Brand Classic, and Nike Hoop Summit. He was rated by Rivals.com as a five-star recruit and was ranked as the eighth best overall player, while ESPN ranked him 10th overall in the Class of 2015. Newman committed to Mississippi State University to play college basketball.

College career

Mississippi State
On April 24, 2015, he signed to play college basketball at Mississippi State University, where his father, Horatio Webster, played from 1997-98.   During his freshman season he averaged 11.3 points per game.

Kansas
On July 1, 2016, he decided to transfer and committed to play at the University of Kansas. Per NCAA regulations, he redshirted during the Jayhawks 2016–2017 season.

In his first and only season with the Jayhawks, Newman averaged 14.2 points, 5.0 rebounds and 2.1 assists per game and was named Big 12 Newcomer of the Year. On March 25, 2018 Malik scored 13 of the Jayhawks' points in overtime and finished with a career-high 32 to lead the Jayhawks to the NCAA Final Four in a victory over Duke University.

Professional career

Sioux Falls Skyforce (2018–2019)
After going undrafted in the 2018 NBA draft, Newman signed a two-way contract with the Los Angeles Lakers on July 1, 2018. Following the conclusion of the Summer League, the Lakers released him on July 19.

On August 6, 2018, Newman signed an Exhibit 10 contract with the Miami Heat. He was waived on October 7. Newman was signed by the Sioux Falls Skyforce of the NBA G League on October 10. In 17 games with the Skyforce, Newman averaged 9.5 points and 2.6 rebounds per game.

Canton Charge (2019–2020)
On January 5, 2019, Newman was traded to the Canton Charge for forward Emanuel Terry. On November 21, Newman had 26 points, three rebounds, four assists, and three steals during a win over the Erie BayHawks. In January 2020, he scored over 20 points in five straight games. Newman finished second on the team in scoring at 16.1 points per game.

Cleveland Cavaliers (2020)
On February 9, 2020, the Cleveland Cavaliers announced that they had signed Newman to a 10-day contract.  Newman made his NBA debut that evening against the Los Angeles Clippers and scored two points on a pair of free throws in four minutes of action. It was his only NBA regular-season appearance.

Bursaspor (2020–2021)
On June 29, 2020, Newman signed with Frutti Extra Bursaspor of the Turkish Super League (BSL).

Ironi Nahariya (2021)
On January 16, 2021, Newman signed with Ironi Nahariya of the Israeli Basketball Premier League. In 2020-21 he was third in the Israel Basketball Premier League in free throw percentage (91.8 per cent).

Cleveland Charge (2021)
On October 23, 2021, Newman signed with the Cleveland Charge. He averaged 17.8 points, 3.2 rebounds and 3.9 assists per game.

Cleveland Cavaliers (2021–2022)
On December 29, 2021, Newman signed a 10-day contract with the Cleveland Cavaliers via the NBA’s hardship exception.

Return to the Charge (2022)
On January 8, 2022, Newman was reacquired by the Cleveland Charge. On March 28, he was waived after suffering a season-ending injury.

Avtodor Saratov (2022–present)
On November 5, 2022, he signed with Avtodor Saratov of the VTB United League.

Career statistics

NBA

Regular season

|-
| style="text-align:left;"|
| style="text-align:left;"|Cleveland
| 1 || 0 || 4.0 || .000 || .000 || 1.000 || .0 || .0 || .0 || .0 || 2.0
|-
| style="text-align:left;"|
| style="text-align:left;"|Cleveland
| 1 || 0 || 8.0 || .600 || .000 || 1.000 || 1.0 || 1.0 || .0 || .0 || 8.0
|- class="sortbottom"
| style="text-align:center;" colspan="2"|Career
| 2 || 0 || 6.0 || .429 || .000 || 1.000 || .5 || .5 || .0 || .0 || 5.0

College

|-
| style="text-align:left;"| 2015–16
| style="text-align:left;"| Mississippi State
| 29 || 22 || 27.2 || .391 || .379 || .687 || 2.8 || 2.2 || .4 || .1 || 11.3
|-
| style="text-align:left;"| 2017–18
| style="text-align:left;"| Kansas
| 39 || 33 || 31.6 || .463 || .415 || .835 || 5.0 || 2.1 || 1.1 || .2 || 14.2
|-
| style="text-align:center;" colspan="2"| Career
| 68 || 55 || 30.0 || .433 || .399 || .780 || 4.1 || 2.1 || .8 || .1 || 13.0

References

External links

Mississippi State Bulldogs bio
Kansas Jayhawks bio
Video highlights of his Senior year

1997 births
Living people
21st-century African-American sportspeople
African-American basketball players
American expatriate basketball people in Turkey
American men's basketball players
Basketball players from Shreveport, Louisiana
Basketball players from Jackson, Mississippi
BC Avtodor Saratov players
Bursaspor Basketbol players
Canton Charge players
Cleveland Cavaliers players
Cleveland Charge players
Kansas Jayhawks men's basketball players
McDonald's High School All-Americans
Mississippi State Bulldogs men's basketball players
Parade High School All-Americans (boys' basketball)
Shooting guards
Sioux Falls Skyforce players
Undrafted National Basketball Association players